The 2012–13 Asia League Ice Hockey season was the 10th season of Asia League Ice Hockey, which consists of teams from China, Japan, and South Korea. Seven teams participated in the league, and the Tohoku Free Blades won the championship.

Regular season

Playoffs

External links
 Asia League Ice Hockey

Asia League Ice Hockey
Asia League Ice Hockey seasons
Asia